The 1979–80 Iowa Hawkeyes men's basketball team represented the University of Iowa as a member of the Big Ten Conference during the 1979–80 college basketball season. The team was led by head coach Lute Olson and played their home games at the Iowa Field House. They finished with a 23–10 (10–8 Big Ten) record, and reached the Final Four of the NCAA tournament as champions of the East Region. To date, this is Iowa's most recent appearance in the NCAA Final Four in men's basketball.

Roster

Schedule and results

|-
!colspan=9 style=| Regular season

|-
!colspan=9 style=|NCAA Tournament

Rankings

Team players in the 1980 NBA Draft

References

Iowa
Iowa Hawkeyes men's basketball seasons
NCAA Division I men's basketball tournament Final Four seasons
Iowa
Hawkeyes
Hawkeyes